Clinical Psychology & Psychotherapy is a bimonthly peer-reviewed medical journal covering clinical psychology and psychotherapy. It was established in 1993 and is published by John Wiley & Sons. The editor-in-chief is Paul Emmelkamp (University of Amsterdam) and associate editor is Marcantonio M. Spada (London South Bank University). According to Journal Citation Reports, the journal has a 2021 impact factor of 3.198, ranking it 68th out of 130 journals in the category "Psychology, Clinical".

References

External links

Clinical psychology journals
Psychotherapy journals
Wiley (publisher) academic journals
Publications established in 1993
Bimonthly journals
English-language journals